Boschia is a genus of flowering plants belonging to the family Malvaceae.

Its native range is Indo-China, Malesia.

Species:

Boschia excelsa 
Boschia grandiflora 
Boschia griffithii 
Boschia mansonii 
Boschia oblongifolia

References

Malvaceae
Malvaceae genera
Helicteroideae